Randall Carl Asadoor (born October 20, 1962, in Fresno, California) is a former Major League Baseball infielder.

Asadoor attended Bullard High School, which has also seen names like Steve Ellsworth, Dave Meier, Stan Papi and Rex Hudler pass through, before moving on to Fresno State University. In 1982, he played collegiate summer baseball with the Cotuit Kettleers of the Cape Cod Baseball League.

Asadoor was originally drafted by the Baltimore Orioles in the 11th round (286th overall) of the 1980 amateur entry draft. He decided not to sign and waited until 1983, when he was drafted by the Texas Rangers in the 3rd round (57th overall)-to sign.

From 1983-1986, Asadoor's played in the minor leagues. On September 14, 1986, at the age of 23, Asadoor made his major league debut with the Padres (to whom he had been traded to on April 6, 1985 for Mitch Williams).

He hit for a high batting average in his brief stint with the Padres, hitting .364 in 55 at-bats. However, this was the only glimpse of the majors that he would ever get. His poor defense may have been a factor in this, as in only 15 games at third base, he made 5 errors.

References

External links

1962 births
Living people
Albuquerque Dukes players
Baseball players from California
Cotuit Kettleers players
American expatriate baseball players in San Marino
Fresno State Bulldogs baseball players
Las Vegas Stars (baseball) players
Major League Baseball third basemen
Charlotte Rangers players
San Diego Padres players
Sportspeople from Fresno, California
T & A San Marino players
Tulsa Drillers players